Autonomous Rail Rapid Transit (ART) is a LiDAR (Light Detection and Ranging) guided articulated bus system for urban passenger transport. Developed by CRRC Zhuzhou Institute Co Ltd, it was unveiled in Zhuzhou in the Hunan province on June 2, 2017. ART has been described as a combination between a bus and a tram - often called a "trackless tram". Its exterior is composed of individual fixed sections joined by articulated gangways, resembling a rubber-tyred tram.

The system is labelled as "autonomous" in English, however, the models in operation are optically guided and feature a driver on board.

Background
The guidance system technology used on these systems was called Visée under their original developer Matra, and is now named Optiguide after being acquired by Siemens.

Description 
A five-carriage bus provides space for 500 passengers. A four carriage model was introduced in 2021 which can carry 320 passengers. Two buses can closely follow each other without being mechanically connected, similarly to multiple unit train control. The entire ART has a low-floor design from a space frame with bolted-on panels to support the weight of passengers. It is built as a bi-directional vehicle, with driver's cabs at either end, allowing it to travel in either direction at full speed.

Sensors and batteries 
The ART is equipped with various optical and other types of sensors to allow the vehicle to automatically follow a route defined by a virtual track of markings on the roadway. A steering wheel also allows the driver to manually guide the vehicle, including around detours. A Lane Departure Warning System helps to keep the vehicle in its lane and automatically warns, if it drifts away from the lane. A Collision Warning System supports the driver on keeping a safe distance with other vehicles on the road and if the proximity reduces below a given level, it alerts the driver by a warning sign. The Route Change Authorization is a navigation device, which analyzes the traffic conditions on the chosen route and can recommend a detour to avoid traffic congestion. The Electronic Rearview Mirrors work with remotely adjustable cameras and provide a clearer view than conventional mirrors, including an auto dimming device to reduce the glare.

The batteries can be recharged via current collectors at stations. The recharging time for a  trip is 30 seconds and for a  trip, 10 minutes.

Benefits and limitations 
A 2018 article by a sustainability academic argued trackless trams could replace both light-rail and bus rapid transit due to low cost, quick installation and low emissions. Others have disputed the claims about cost and quick installations, and argued that ART is a proprietary technology with little deployment worldwide. Other experts have argued the technology is overhyped, that optical guidance technology is not new, and that current proposals largely represent a repackaging of the bus as a rail-replacement technology. As of 2022 there are no systems outside of China and few proposals. That may be because:
The system is not autonomous
The system is not rail based and so has the ride qualities of a bus
The vehicles can get stuck in road traffic, meaning that it is not true rapid transit.
Being a "gadgetbahn", the required vehicles cannot be bought through competitive tender.

Proponents have argued the lack of rails means cheaper construction costs. Multi-axle hydraulic steering technology and bogie-like wheel arrangement could allow lower swept path in turns, thus requiring less side clearance.

However, because the ART is a guided system, ruts and depressions could be worn into the road by the alignment of the large number of wheels, so reinforcement of the roadway to prevent those problems may be as disruptive as the installation of rails in a light rail system. Researchers in 2021 found evidence of significant road wear due to trackless tram vehicles, which undermined claims of quick construction, with the researchers finding significant road strengthening was required by the technology. The suitability of the system for winter climates with ice and snow has not yet been proven. The higher rolling resistance of rubber tires requires more energy for propulsion than the steel wheels of a light rail vehicle.

A few abandoned proposals for light-rail lines have been revived as ART proposals because of the lower projected costs. However, a different report, by the Australian Railways Association, which supports light rail, said there were reliability questions with ART installations, implying the initial suggested capital cost savings were illusory. A November 2020 proposal for a trackless tram system in the City of Wyndham, near Melbourne, posited a cost of $AU23.53M per km for roadworks, vehicles, recharge point and depots. Recently completed light rail systems in Australia have had costs of between $AU80M and $AU150M per km.

The Government of New South Wales considered the system as an alternative to light rail for a line to connect Sydney Olympic Park to Parramatta.  However, concerns were raised that there was only one supplier of the technology, and that the development of "long articulated buses" was "too much in its preliminary phase" to meet the project deadlines. Instead, the plan was to build a light-rail line which would connect to another light-rail route already under construction, so passengers would not have to change vehicles.

The Auckland Light Rail Group, in its studies of trackless trams for the City Centre to Mangere line, found that trackless trams would have a lower capacity than claimed. The official specifications for the ARRT assume a standing density of eight passengers per square meter, whereas many transit systems have more typical standing densities of four passengers per square meter.

List of commercially operating lines

Proposed systems
Proposals, including vehicle testing, have been made in several countries.
 China, Changsha.  Changsha Meixi Lake to Changsha Municipal Government line, reported to start construction in 2021 for completion in 2022
 China, Harbin.  In May 2021 testing of a vehicle was underway with plans for an  route with 11 stations. There are reports that stations have been constructed in January 2021 and trial operations will commence in August 2021.
 China, Tongli. As of February 2021 testing was underway with the service expected to open to passengers by the end of 2021.
 China, Xi'an. Two routes.
 Malaysia. Iskandar Malaysia Bus Rapid Transit in Johor.  ART is one technology under consideration for the corridor.  A three-month test of an ART vehicle, along with eight other bus types, began in April 2021.
 Malaysia. The three line Kuching LRT project was proposed as a light-rail in 2018, but shelved due to costs. In 2019 ART announced ART technology had been selected instead, due to its lower costs for similar levels of service. As of July 2021 the project has not commenced construction.
 Qatar. The system was considered for use during the 2022 FIFA World Cup, but was not pursued. In July 2019 a two-week test with one vehicle was undertaken in Doha, the first trial outside China. 
 Australia, Western Australia. In March 2021, the Australian Government provided $2 million to produce a business case to investigate a trackless tram on Scarborough Beach Road between the Stirling City Centre and the Perth CBD.

See also 

 Automatic train operation
 Bi-articulated bus
 Bombardier Guided Light Transit
 Guided bus
 Phileas
 Rubber-tyred trams
 Trackless train
 Translohr
 Transport Est-Ouest Rouennais
 Wright StreetCar

References 

Guided bus
Self-driving cars
Bus rapid transit in China